The 1982 World Junior Ice Hockey Championships (1982 WJHC) was the sixth edition Ice Hockey World Junior Championship and was held from December 22, 1981, until January 2, 1982. The tournament was hosted by the United States in various cities across the state of Minnesota with some games also played in the Canadian provinces of Manitoba and Ontario.

Canada won their first gold medal at the World Juniors, while Czechoslovakia and Finland won silver and bronze, respectively. Meanwhile, the Soviet Union finished fourth, marking the only time they played an entire World Juniors tournament and failed to win a medal (the USSR was disqualified in 1987). The host United States featuring future hall of famers John Vanbiesbrouck, Chris Chelios, and Phil Housley, finished sixth.

Pool A
The 1982 tournament was a round-robin format, with the top three teams winning gold, silver and bronze medals respectively.

Final standings

 was relegated to Pool B for the 1983 World Junior Ice Hockey Championships.

Results

Scoring leaders

Tournament awards

Pool B
Pool B was played on March 16–20, in Heerenveen in the Netherlands.  Two groups of four played round robins, with placement games pitting the respective finishers against each other.  Japan made their debut, replacing absent Poland.

Preliminary round

Group A

Group B

Final round

7th place game

5th place game

3rd place game

1st place game

 was promoted to Pool A for the 1983 World Junior Ice Hockey Championships.

Scoring leaders

References

 
1982 World Junior Hockey Championships at TSN
 Results at passionhockey.com

World Junior Ice Hockey Championships
World Junior Ice Hockey Championships
World Junior Ice Hockey Championships
International ice hockey competitions hosted by Canada
December 1981 sports events in the United States
January 1982 sports events in the United States
International ice hockey competitions hosted by the United States
Ice hockey competitions in Minnesota
Ice hockey competitions in Ontario
1981 in sports in Minnesota
1982 in sports in Minnesota
1981 in Ontario
1982 in Ontario
1981 in Manitoba
1982 in Manitoba
1980s in Winnipeg
Ice hockey competitions in Minneapolis
1980s in Minneapolis
Bloomington, Minnesota
Sports competitions in Duluth, Minnesota
20th century in Duluth, Minnesota
New Ulm, Minnesota
Mankato, Minnesota
Ice hockey competitions in Brandon, Manitoba
International Falls, Minnesota
Sports in St. Cloud, Minnesota
Sport in Kenora
March 1982 sports events in Europe
1981–82 in Dutch ice hockey
World Junior Ice Hockey Championships, 1982
International ice hockey competitions hosted by the Netherlands